Great Howorth House is a Grade II listed privately owned historic house in Wardle, Rochdale, Greater Manchester.

History 
Great Howarth House was the residence of the Howarths of Howarth from the 13th century until the death of Radcliffe Howarth who died unmarried in 1768, when it was sold to John Entwistle and the house remains the residence of the Entwistle family.

Architecture 
The house, dating largely from the early 19th century preserves 9 original sash windows, and a tunnel vaulted cellar with stone mullioned window which probably dates from the earlier building of the 17th century.

See also 
Listed buildings in Wardle, Greater Manchester
 Howorth, surname

References 

Listed buildings in Greater Manchester
Buildings and structures in the Metropolitan Borough of Rochdale
Buildings and structures in Rochdale